Curt Conway (May 4, 1915 – April 10, 1974) was an American actor. He was sometimes billed as Curtis Conway or Kurt Conway. Born in Boston, Massachusetts, Conway appeared in a number of Broadway plays, had small parts in films. such as Hud (1963), and appeared on TV from 1960 until his death.

A member of the Group Theatre, and later the Actors Studio, Conway went on to found his own acting school, the Theatre Studio, in 1952. Located at 353 West 48th Street in Manhattan, its faculty included, at one time or another, Nora Dunfee, Robert Alvin, and fellow Actors Studio members Lonny Chapman and David Pressman. The Actors Studio also supplied some of the school's participating directors, namely Martin Ritt, Alan Schneider, and Joseph Anthony; also participating were Horton Foote and Everett Chambers.  In the late 1960s and early 1970s, he taught acting at the School of Performing Arts in San Diego and the University of California at Irvine (UCI).

Conway was married three times, including to actress Kim Stanley from 1949 to 1956, with whom he had one daughter.

Conway died from a heart attack at the age of 58.

Partial play credits

 Johnny Johnson* (1936)
 Marching Song* (1937)
 Casey Jones* (1938)
 The Time of Your Life* (1938)
 Quiet City* (1939)
 No for an Answer (1941)
 A View from the Bridge* / A Memory of Two Mondays* (1955)
 A Touch of the Poet* (1958)

* denotes Broadway productions

Filmography

References

External links

1915 births
1974 deaths
American male film actors
American male stage actors
American male television actors
Male actors from Boston
20th-century American male actors